A referendum on the future status of the islands was held in the Trust Territory of the Pacific Islands on 8 July 1975. Voters were offered six options:
Independence
Commonwealth
Free Association
Statehood
To retain the current status
Another status

In Chuuk, Kosrae, Pohnpei and Yap (later to become the Federated States of Micronesia) option one (independence) received the highest number of votes in favour (59.1%), whilst Free Association (58.0%) and the present status (59.0%) also received majorities in favour. Voter turnout was 52.6%. In the Marshall Islands option five was the only option to be approved, with 77% voting in favour, although voter turnout was only 35.2%. In Palau only options three (68% in favour) and five (78% in favour) were approved.

Results

Chuuk, Kosrae, Pohnpei and Yap

Marshall Islands

Palau

References

Trust Territory
1975 in the Marshall Islands
1975 in Palau
1975 in the Federated States of Micronesia
Referendums in the Federated States of Micronesia
Referendums in the Marshall Islands
Referendums in Palau
Independence referendums
Multiple-choice referendums
July 1975 events in Oceania